The 1988 Vuelta a España was the 43rd edition of the Vuelta a España, one of cycling's Grand Tours. The Vuelta began in Santa Cruz de Tenerife, with an individual time trial on 25 April, and Stage 12 occurred on 6 May with a stage from Logroño. The race finished in Madrid on 15 May.

Stage 12
6 May 1988 — Logroño to Jaca,

Stage 13
7 May 1988 — Jaca to Cerler,

Stage 14
8 May 1988 — Benasque to Andorra,

Stage 15
9 May 1988 — La Seu d'Urgell to Sant Quirze del Vallès,

Stage 16
10 May 1988 — Valencia to Albacete,

Stage 17
11 May 1988 — Albacete to Toledo,

Stage 18
12 May 1988 — Toledo to Ávila,

Stage 19
13 May 1988 — Ávila to Segovia,

Stage 20
14 May 1988 — Las Rozas to Villalba,  (ITT)

Stage 21
15 May 1988 — Villalba to Madrid,

References

12
1988,12